Lieutenant de vaisseau Lavallée (F790) is a  in the French Navy. The ship's name pays tribute to the resistance fighter shot in deportation in 1944.

Design 

Armed by a crew of 90 sailors, these vessels have the reputation of being among the most difficult in bad weather. Their high windage makes them particularly sensitive to pitch and roll as soon as the sea is formed.

Their armament, consequent for a vessel of this tonnage, allows them to manage a large spectrum of missions. During the Cold War, they were primarily used to patrol the continental shelf of the Atlantic Ocean in search of Soviet Navy submarines. Due to the poor performance of the hull sonar, as soon as an echo appeared, the reinforcement of an ASM frigate was necessary to chase it using its towed variable depth sonar.

Their role as patrollers now consists mainly of patrols and assistance missions, as well as participation in UN missions (blockades, flag checks) or similar marine policing tasks (fight against drugs, extraction of nationals, fisheries control, etc.). The mer-mer 38 or mer-mer 40 missiles have been landed, but they carry several machine guns and machine guns, more suited to their new missions.

Its construction cost was estimated at 270,000,000 French francs.

Construction and career 
Lieutenant de vaisseau Lavallée was laid down on 11 November 1977 at Arsenal de Lorient, Lorient. Launched on 29 May 1979 and commissioned on 16 August 1980.

In 2011, she participated in Operation Harmattan. During this deployment, he fired numerous shells against the ground and participated in the destruction of numerous military vehicles. The day of 11 September was marked by counter battery fire from the earth. These surrounding shots fell near the building, at a distance of between 50 and 200 m. As such, the building receives the cross of military value.

On 13 November 2013, the vessel was in a maritime surveillance operation on the approaches to Brest accompanied by the service vessel Malabar and the mine hunter Céphée.

From the end of 2014, it participated in the Corymbe Mission, a naval device aimed at ensuring the permanent presence of a vessel in the Gulf of Guinea and off the coast of West Africa.

It was on the ship that on 8 December 2017, the resumption of official diplomatic exchanges between the French ambassador in Dakar, Christophe Bigot, and the new Gambian government, following the fall of the ex-dictator Yahya Jammeh in January 2017 which led to the reopening of the French diplomatic branch in November of the same year.

She was decommissioned on 2 July 2018.

Citations 

Ships built in Lorient
1979 ships
D'Estienne d'Orves-class avisos